Eunice Cheryl Lee (born 1970) is an American lawyer who serves as a United States circuit judge of the United States Court of Appeals for the Second Circuit. Born in West Germany, she attended Ohio State University and Yale Law School. In 2021, she was confirmed by the U.S. Senate to serve on the Second Circuit after being nominated by President Joe Biden.

Early life and education 

Lee was born on a United States Air Force base in Wiesbaden, Germany. She received her Bachelor of Arts degree from Ohio State University in 1993 and her Juris Doctor from Yale Law School in 1996.

Career 

Lee began her legal career as a law clerk for Judge Susan J. Dlott on the United States District Court for the Southern District of Ohio from 1996 to 1997, and Judge Eric L. Clay on the United States Court of Appeals for the Sixth Circuit from 1997 to 1998. From 1998 to 2019, she worked with the Office of the Appellate Defender in New York City; from 2003 to 2019 she also served as director of recruitment and outreach at the Office of the Appellate Defender. She joined the office as a staff attorney and was named supervising attorney in 2001. She served as an adjunct assistant professor of clinical law at New York University School of Law from 2003 to 2019, teaching a criminal appellate defense clinic. On January 26, 2022, it was speculated by some media outlets that Lee would be considered by Joe Biden as a nominee to replace Stephen Breyer on the U.S. Supreme Court. Biden ultimately chose U.S. Court of Appeals judge Ketanji Brown Jackson.

Federal judicial service 

On May 12, 2021, President Joe Biden nominated Lee to serve as a United States circuit judge for the United States Court of Appeals for the Second Circuit to the seat vacated by Judge Robert Katzmann, who assumed senior status on January 21, 2021.
On June 9, 2021, a hearing on her nomination was held before the Senate Judiciary Committee. During her confirmation hearing, she distanced herself from the contents of a letter she wrote as an Ohio State undergrad in 1991, which talks about Thomas being a "black conservative." On July 15, 2021, her nomination was reported out of committee by a 11–10 vote, with Senator Lindsey Graham passed on the vote. On August 5, 2021, the Senate invoked cloture on Lee's nomination by a 50–49 vote, with Senator Graham absent. On August 7, 2021, her nomination was confirmed by a 50–47 vote. Upon confirmation, Lee became the longest-serving public defender to ever serve as a judge on a U.S. Court of Appeals. She is the second African American woman ever to serve on the Second Circuit and was the only judge with experience as a federal defender serving on that circuit court until the confirmation of Sarah A. L. Merriam. She received her commission on August 16, 2021.

See also 
 List of African-American federal judges
 List of African-American jurists
 Joe Biden judicial appointment controversies
 Joe Biden Supreme Court candidates

References

External links 

1970 births
Living people
20th-century American women lawyers
20th-century American lawyers
21st-century American judges
21st-century American women lawyers
21st-century American lawyers
21st-century American women judges
African-American judges
African-American lawyers
Judges of the United States Court of Appeals for the Second Circuit
New York (state) lawyers
New York University School of Law faculty
Ohio State University alumni
People from Wiesbaden
Public defenders
United States court of appeals judges appointed by Joe Biden
Yale Law School alumni